Astrid Gilardi (born 19 February 2003) is an Italian professional footballer who plays as a Goalkeeper for the Serie A club Inter Milan.

Club career
Gilardi began playing at the age of 6 in the Polisportiva Mandello school of football in a team made up entirely of boys. In 2014, she moved to ASD Real Meda and played with the Women's team for three seasons. 

In 2017, she joined Inter Milan where she spent time developing in both the Primavera and the First team. 

In 2021, Gilardi signed a new contract with Inter, agreeing to stay with the team until at least 2024.

International career
Gilardi was called up to the Italy Under 16s Team in 2017, and immediately moved up to the  Italy Under 17s Team in 2018. She is yet to make an appearance for the Italy National Team.

References

2003 births
Living people
Women's association football goalkeepers
Italian women's footballers
Inter Milan (women) players